Adam Again is the second solo album by Michael Omartian, released originally in 1976, on Myrrh Records as both the original single album and as  a compilation of White Horse and Adam Again. It was released overseas under the title Onward, along with a different cover.

Track listing

Side one
 "Ain’t You Glad" 2:52
 "No Matter What Shape You’re In" 3:16
 "See This House” 3:53
 "Wacher Sign" 3:30
 “Annie the Poet” 3:58

Side two
 "Telos Suite: Prelude" 1:31
 "Alive and Well” 4:44
 "Adam Again" 4:59
 "Here He Comes" 6:00

Personnel 
 Michael Omartian – vocals, keyboards, percussion, synthesizers (3, 6),  drums (3)
 Dean Parks – guitars (1, 2, 9)
 Lee Ritenour – guitars (2, 4, 7, 9)
 Richard Bennett – guitars (7, 8)
 Larry Carlton – guitars (8), guitar solo (9)
 Wilton Felder – bass (1, 9)
 Scott Edwards – bass (2, 4)
 Leland Sklar – bass (5)
 David Hungate – bass (7, 8)
 David Kemper – drums (1, 5, 7, 8, 9)
 Ed Greene – drums (2, 4)
 Victor Feldman – percussion (7, 8)
 Ernie Watts – horns, alto sax solo (3)
 Don Menza – horns
 Paul Hubinon – horns, trumpet solo (7)
 Vincent DeRosa – horns
 David Duke – horns
 Sid Sharp – concertmaster 
 The LA Super Strings – strings
 Stormie Omartian – backing vocals
 Ann White – backing vocals
 Carolyn Willis – backing vocals

Production 
 Michael Omartian – producer, arrangements 
 Tommy Vicari – engineer 
 The Mastering Lab (Hollywood, California) – mastering location 
 Harry Langdon – photography 

1976 albums
Michael Omartian albums
Albums produced by Michael Omartian